Indupur is a village in the district of Deoria in Uttar Pradesh, India.

Economy
Approximately 30% of Indupur's population is employed. Approximately 60% of those employed work in agriculture, 24% work in trade and commerce, 10% work in both agriculture and trade and commerce, 10% work in other services, 6% work in transport and communication, 8% work in construction, and 2% are marginal workers (working for less than half of the year).

Demographics

According to provisional data from the 2011 census, the Indupur had a population of 3,370 with 1,703 men and 1,667 women.

References

Villages in Deoria district